Romero Canyon is located in the Santa Catalina Mountains and part of the Coronado National Forest.

References

Santa Catalina Mountains
Canyons and gorges of Arizona
Landforms of Pima County, Arizona